Gharat Basale Saare is an Indian Marathi language short series which aired on Zee Marathi during lockdown period. It was premiered from 8 June 2020 airing Monday to Friday and stopped on 10 July 2020 completing 25 episodes. In this show, puppetry was done by Padhye family with various dolls and puppets.

Summary 
Famous ventriloquist and puppeteer Ramdas Padhye and his family entertain with their art. Due to the lockdown, the other puppets are stuck at home with Ardhavatrao and Aavdabai. The Padhye family talks about ventriloquism and puppetry, all the while explaining and narrating various stories using the dolls.

References

External links 
 Gharat Basale Saare at ZEE5

Marathi-language television shows
2020 Indian television series debuts
Zee Marathi original programming
2020 Indian television series endings